Gymnázium Kráľovský Chlmec (hun. Királyhelmeci Gimnázium) is a high school in Kráľovský Chlmec, Slovakia.
It was founded in 1949 and it offers education in Slovak and Hungarian language.

It is one of the major educational institutions in the region.

External links 
 Official website

Schools in Slovakia
Gymnasiums in Slovakia
Educational institutions established in 1949
1949 establishments in Czechoslovakia